The 2023 Big Sky Conference women's basketball tournament is the upcoming postseason tournament for the Big Sky Conference, to be held March 4–8 at Idaho Central Arena in Boise, Idaho. It will be the 40th edition of the tournament, which debuted in 1983. The winner will receive the Big Sky's automatic bid to the 2023 NCAA tournament.

Seeds 
The ten teams will be seeded by conference record, with a tiebreaker system for  identical conference records. The top six teams will receive a first-round bye.

Schedule

Bracket

References

See also 
 2023 Big Sky Conference men's basketball tournament

2022–23 Big Sky Conference women's basketball season
Big Sky Conference women's basketball tournament
2023 in sports in Idaho
Basketball competitions in Boise, Idaho
College basketball tournaments in Idaho
Women's sports in Idaho